In computer programming,  ( or ) is a fundamental function in most dialects of the Lisp programming language.  constructs memory objects which hold two values or pointers to two values. These objects are referred to as (cons) cells, conses, non-atomic s-expressions ("NATSes"), or (cons) pairs. In Lisp jargon, the expression "to cons x onto y" means to construct a new object with (cons x y).

It is loosely related to the object-oriented notion of a constructor, which creates a new object given arguments, and more closely related to the constructor function of an algebraic data type system.

The word "cons" and expressions like "to cons onto" are also part of a more general functional programming jargon. Sometimes operators that have a similar purpose, especially in the context of list processing, are pronounced "cons". (A good example is the :: operator in ML, Scala, F#, Lean and Elm or the : operator in Haskell, which adds an element to the beginning of a list.)

Use
Although cons cells can be used to hold ordered pairs of data, they are more commonly used to construct more complex compound data structures, notably lists and binary trees.

Ordered pairs
For example, the Lisp expression  constructs a cell holding 1 in its left half (the so-called  field) and 2 in its right half (the  field). In Lisp notation, the value  looks like:

 (1 . 2)

Note the dot between 1 and 2; this indicates that the S-expression is a "dotted pair" (a so-called "cons pair"), rather than a "list."

Lists

In Lisp, lists are implemented on top of cons pairs. More specifically, any list structure in Lisp is either:

An empty list , which is a special object usually called .
A cons cell whose  is the first element of the list and whose  is a list containing the rest of the elements.
Note that  is the only list that is not also a cons pair. As an example, consider a list whose elements are 1, 2, and 3. Such a list can be created in three steps:

Cons 3 onto , the empty list
Cons 2 onto the result
Cons 1 onto the result

which is equivalent to the single expression:

 (cons 1 (cons 2 (cons 3 nil)))

or its shorthand:

 (list 1 2 3)

The resulting value is the list:

 (1 . (2 . (3 . nil)))

i.e.

  *--*--*--nil
  |  |  |
  1  2  3

which is generally abbreviated as:

 (1 2 3)

Thus,  can be used to add one element to the front of an existing linked list. For example, if x is the list we defined above, then  will produce the list:

 (5 1 2 3)

Trees
For example, the code:

 (cons (cons 1 2) (cons 3 4))

results in the tree:

 ((1 . 2) . (3 . 4))

i.e.

    *
   / \
  *   *
 / \ / \
 1 2 3 4

Technically, the list (1 2 3) in the previous example is also a binary tree, one which happens to be particularly unbalanced. To see this, simply rearrange the diagram:

  *--*--*--nil
  |  |  |
  1  2  3

to the following equivalent:

    *
   / \
  1   *
     / \
    2   *
       / \
      3  nil

Use in conversation
Cons can refer to the general process of memory allocation, as opposed to using destructive operations of the kind that would be used in an imperative programming language. For example:

I sped up the code a bit by putting in side effects instead of having it cons ridiculously.

Functional implementation
Since Lisp has first-class functions, all data structures, including cons cells, can be implemented using functions. For example, in Scheme:
(define (cons x y)
  (lambda (m) (m x y)))
(define (car z)
  (z (lambda (p q) p)))
(define (cdr z)
  (z (lambda (p q) q)))
This technique is known as Church encoding. It re-implements the cons, car, and cdr operations, using a function as the "cons cell". Church encoding is a usual way of defining data structures in pure lambda calculus, an abstract, theoretical model of computation that is closely related to Scheme.

This implementation, while academically interesting, is impractical because it renders cons cells indistinguishable from any other Scheme procedure, as well as introduces unnecessary computational inefficiencies.

However, the same kind of encoding can be used for more complex algebraic data types with variants, where it may even turn out to be more efficient than other kinds of encoding.
This encoding also has the advantage of being implementable in a statically typed language that doesn't have variants, such as Java, using interfaces instead of lambdas.

See also
 Lisp (programming language)
 CAR and CDR
 Constructor (computer science)
 Algebraic data type
 Hash consing

References

External links
 SDRAW, Common Lisp  code for drawing draws cons cell structures. From David S. Touretzky.

Functional programming
Lisp (programming language)
Articles with example Lisp (programming language) code
Articles with example Scheme (programming language) code
Composite data types
Data types